Bromoacetone is an organic compound with the formula . It is a colorless liquid although impure samples appear yellow or even brown.  It is a lachrymatory agent  and a precursor to other organic compounds.

Occurrence in nature
Bromoacetone is present (less than 1%) in the essential oil of a seaweed (Asparagopsis taxiformis) from the vicinity of the Hawaiian Islands.

Synthesis
Bromoacetone is available commercially, sometimes stabilized with magnesium oxide.  It was first described in the 19th century, attributed to N. Sokolowsky.

Bromoacetone is prepared by combining bromine and acetone, with catalytic acid. As with all ketones, acetone enolizes in the presence of acids or bases. The alpha carbon then undergoes electrophilic substitution with bromine. The main difficulty with this method is over-bromination, resulting in di- and tribrominated products. If a base is present, bromoform is obtained instead, by the haloform reaction.

Applications
It was used in World War I as a chemical weapon, called BA by British and B-Stoff (Weisskreuz) by Germans. Due to its toxicity, it is not used as a riot control agent anymore. Bromoacetone is a versatile reagent in organic synthesis.  It is, for example, the precursor to hydroxyacetone by reaction with aqueous sodium hydroxide.

See also 
Use of poison gas in World War I
Chloroacetone
Fluoroacetone
Iodoacetone
Thioacetone

References

Organobromides
Lachrymatory agents
World War I chemical weapons
Ketones